Goossee is a lake in Kreis Rendsburg-Eckernförde, Schleswig-Holstein, Germany.

Lakes of Schleswig-Holstein